Nick Petersen (born May 27, 1989) is a Canadian professional ice hockey player who is currently playing for EC KAC of the ICE Hockey League (ICEHL). He was selected by the Pittsburgh Penguins in the fourth round (121st overall) of the 2009 NHL Entry Draft.

Playing career
On May 27, 2010, he was signed by the Pittsburgh Penguins to a three-year entry-level contract.

Upon the final year of his entry level contract, Petersen was placed on unconditional waivers on September 11, 2012. The termination of the contract and placement of Petersen on unconditional waivers cost the Penguins $125 due to the mutual agreement between the two parties and placed the Penguins' at forty-nine roster players.

On September 28, 2012, Petersen was invited as a free agent to the American Hockey League's Houston Aeros 2012 Training Camp. During training camp he was sent down to their farm team, the Orlando Solar Bears of the ECHL, where on October 11, 2012, he was confirmed on their season starting roster for the 2012–13 season. Petersen split the year between the Solar Bears and the Aeros, contributing with 14 points in 37 games in Houston.

A free agent at the conclusion of the season, Petersen agreed to his first European contract in signing a one-year deal with German club Schwenninger Wild Wings, the newest member of the DEL, on July 11, 2013. After one year with the Schwenningen team, he moved to fellow DEL side Iserlohn Roosters, where he saw the ice in 107 DEL contests, tallying 43 goals and 59 assists during his two-year tenure.

On April 4, 2016, he agreed as a free agent to a two-year deal with fellow German DEL team, Eisbären Berlin. At the conclusion of his two-year tenure with Eisbären Berlin, Petersen left Germany as a free agent to sign a one-year deal in the neighbouring EBEL with EC KAC on May 13, 2018.

Career statistics

Awards and honours

References

External links

1989 births
Canadian expatriate ice hockey players in Germany
Eisbären Berlin players
Houston Aeros (1994–2013) players
Ice hockey people from Quebec
Iserlohn Roosters players
EC KAC players
Living people
Orlando Solar Bears (ECHL) players
Pittsburgh Penguins draft picks
Saint John Sea Dogs players
Schwenninger Wild Wings players
Shawinigan Cataractes players
Wheeling Nailers players
Wilkes-Barre/Scranton Penguins players
Canadian ice hockey right wingers